Sun d'Or served the following destinations (Winter 2010–2011) at the time of closure on 1 April 2011.

They were also confirmed to start Riga (Latvia), Copenhagen (Denmark) and Venice (Italy) for Summer 2011, all were to begin between March and June.

Asia
 Israel
Tel Aviv - Ben Gurion International Airport Base

Europe
 Belarus
 Minsk Airport
 Bulgaria
 Burgas Airport [Summer only]
 Croatia
 Zagreb Airport [Winter only]
 France
 Grenoble-Isère Airport [Winter only]
Paris - Paris-Charles de Gaulle Airport
 Germany
 Düsseldorf Airport
 Frankfurt Airport
 Munich Airport
 Greece
 Athens International Airport [Summer only]
 Heraklion Airport [Summer only]
 Kos Airport [Summer only]
 Rhodes International Airport [Summer only]
 Santorini Airport [Summer only]
 Italy
 Brescia Airport [Winter only]
 Catania-Fontanarossa Airport [Summer only]
 Lamezia Airport [Summer only]
 Naples Airport [Summer only]
Rome - Leonardo da Vinci-Fiumicino Airport
 Turin Airport [Winter only]
 Verona Airport[Summer only]
 Lithuania
 Vilnius Airport [Summer only]
 Netherlands
Amsterdam - Amsterdam Airport Schiphol [Summer only]
 Poland
 Lódz Wladyslaw Reymont Airport [Winter only]
 Katowice Airport [Winter/Spring only]
Wrocław - Copernicus Airport Wrocław
 Warsaw Airport [Spring/Summer only]
 Portugal
 Lisbon International Airport [Summer only]
 Russia
Moscow - Domodedovo International Airport
Rostov-on-Don - Rostov Airport [Summer/Spring only]
 Slovakia
Bratislava - M. R. Štefánik Airport
 Slovenia
 Ljubljana Jože Pučnik Airport [Summer only]
 Spain
 Barcelona Airport
 Málaga Airport [Winter/Spring only]
 Switzerland
 Geneva International Airport

External links
Sun d'Or International Airlines

References

Lists of airline destinations